Eleven ships of the French Navy have borne the name Renard, after the Fox or the character Reynard. The name was also popular for privateers.

Naval ships
 , a fire ship.
 , a 16-gun corvette, deleted from Navy lists in 1748.
  (1762), a 20-gun ship, sold in 1780.
 , a corvette captured by the British in 1780.
 , formerly the captured British privateer Fox.
 , a 12-gun lugger. She appears to have been converted to a schooner; if so, she was the vessel that  captured in 1803 and that became , later renamed to HMS Crafty. The Spanish captured Crafty in 1807.
 , a 16-gun .
  (1829), an 8-gun .
  (1866), a second-class aviso.
  (1916), an auxiliary patrol boat.

See also 
 Renard Bleu (1917), formerly the American tug Helen Hope, which the French Navy purchased in 1918.

Privateers
Renard, of Dieppe, was a two-masted vessel armed with one gun and five swivel guns, and carrying a crew of 29 men. The sloop  captured her on 2 July 1747.
Renard was a cutter of 10 guns and 71 men, belonging to Guadeloupe, that  captured on 7 August 1795 off Martinique.
 was a privateer that  captured on 12 November 1797 on the Irish station. The Royal Navy took her into service under her existing name and sold her in 1807.
Renard was a French privateer lugger that  captured on 12 January 1800.
Renard was a privateer sloop of three guns and 15 men that Surinam captured on 26 March 1800.
Renard was a French privateer that the hired armed lugger Nile captured on 1 November 1800 off Folkestone.
Renard was a French privateer captured on 16 November 1802 by a British squadron in the Mediterranean.
Renarde (or Renard) was French privateer lugger that  captured on 7 November 1807.
Renard was a felucca-rigged privateer of one 6-pounder gun and 47 men that the boats of  captured on 8 February 1808 off Santiago de Cuba.
Renard was a privateer cutter of six guns and 24 men that  and  captured on 2 December 1810.
Renard, launched in 1812, was a privateer cutter owned by Robert Surcouf.

Notes, citations, and references

Notes

Citations

References
 
 

French Navy ship names